The 2014 Badminton Asia Championships was the 33rd edition of the Badminton Asia Championships. It was held in Gimcheon, South Korea, from April 22 to April 27.

Venue
Gimcheon Indoor Stadium.

Medalists

Final Results

Men's singles

Women's singles

Men's doubles

Women's doubles

Mixed doubles

References

External links
Badminton Asia Championships 2014

Badminton Asia Championships
Asian Badminton Championships
Badminton tournaments in South Korea
2014 in South Korean sport
Sport in Gimcheon